Idus of Leinster was an Irish saint of the fifth century. He was said to be a disciple of Saint Patrick, who baptized him. Saint Idus took part in the Great Evangelization of Ireland. He was made bishop of Alt-Fadha (Ath-Fado) in Leinster by Patrick. Feast day - July 14.

External links
Saints of July 14: Idus 

5th-century Irish bishops
5th-century Christian saints
Medieval saints of Leinster
Disciples of Saint Patrick